Citybeat may refer to:
Citybeat (band), a 1980s Hong Kong pop music group
Belfast CityBeat, a Northern Irish radio station
Cincinnati CityBeat, an independent local arts and issues publication in Cincinnati, Ohio
LA CityBeat,  a defunct alternative weekly newspaper in Los Angeles, California 
San Diego CityBeat, an alternative weekly newspaper in San Diego, California
Citybeat, a weekly entertainment and music section in the  Australian free afternoon daily newspaper mX

See also
City Beat, a New Zealand reality television series